Maikash Akbarabadi (1902–1991) was a writer in the Urdu language. Syed Mohammed Ali Shah Maikash Akbarabadi was born in 1902, in the Mewa Katra family, which traces its links in India to Moghul times.

}

Personal life
Muhammad Ali Shah Jafri Niyazi was the eldest son of Asghar Ali Shah Sahib who was the eldest son of Muzaffar Ali Shah Sahib , a renowned Sufi of his times and author of a huge book on Sufism which consists of three volumes entitled "Jawahar-e-Ghaibi". It is the best memorial of his literary accomplishments, published by Nawal Kishore Press Munshi Nawal Kishore. He was just two-and-a-half years old at the time of the death of his father, while his younger brother, Ahmed Ali Shah Saheb, was just three months old. The upbringing of these two very young children was left to their widowed mother who was then just twenty four years old. She was the granddaughter of Mir Aazam Ali, a contemporary of Mirza Asad Ullah Khan Ghalib and belonged to a very respectable family. Despite pressures from certain sections upon her to go back to her parents' house, she stayed put and faced the challenges of life. She arranged for the best education of her children and sent them to Moulvi Sa'adat Ullah qadri Sahib, a very renowned "Mohaqiq" and "Mohadids" of his times, near Jama Masjid, Agra. Moulvi Sa'adat Ullah Sahib is said to have a dream of the Islamic prophet Muhammad only a few days back. There he had shown two young children and asked him to take best care of them and impart all necessary knowledge of Quran, Hadis, and Fiqh. He was on the lookout for them, and when he saw these two children he immediately recognized and welcomed them with full respect. They had the best of education at his hands and were awarded certificates of excellence. They were referred to Aligarh, M.A.O College in 1916, where in that time theology education was also imparted. These two boys were in their teens whereas in the college mosque there were very aged, senior students with long beards. Nazim-E-Deeniyaat of that time took their examination and was highly impressed with their knowledge, proficiency and method of recital. While he gave them certificates, he called the senior students for a demonstration, who are said to have carried these two young boys on their shoulders to various parts of the college in a procession.

Education
Muhammad Ali Shah sahib then pursued further intensive studies of logic, fiqh and Tasawwuf, where as his younger brother was admitted to Baptist Mission High School. His younger brother, Ahmed Ali Shah, passed with distinction in all the examinations and studied at St. John's College to obtain post-graduation in Persian and a law degree from Allahabad University. He got involved in the worldly affairs of looking after the family affair first as an advocate and then as judicial and Administrative officer in erstwhile state of Rajputana. Ahmed Ali Shah retired as Civil Supplies Commissioner from Rajasthan and moved to Aligarh as the Registrar of Jamia Urdu (Seeds of which were sown at his residence in Mewa Katra). Prof Has Jafri, his only son settled in Aligarh and was Pro-Vice Chancellor, Registrar and Controller of Aligarh Muslim University before moving to Ajmer as the Member Rajasthan Public Service Commission.

Once there was a discussion with someone about Muawiyah. The person started defending and praising Muawiyah. In order to avoid controversy he ended up by praying that on the Day of Judgement he may be with Ali whereas the person who was having argument may be with Muawiyah. The concerned person felt annoyed but could not say anything as he was putting the two at par and amply displayed his wit.

Meeting of the Socialist Forum took place at his house in the late 1930s.

Death
He died on 10th Shawwal 1411 Hijri (1991 CE). After him, his eldest son Syed Moazzam Ali Shah Jafri Niazi, a Professor of Psychology at St John's College Agra took over the spiritual mantle . After him, then under the guidance and spiritual leadership of his grandson the present Sajjada Nasheen Hz Syed Ajmal Ali Shah Jafri Niazi, the message of love, peace and brotherhood which was so dear to Maikash Saheb continues to be propagated. Every year a function to commemorate and promote Urdu poetry is organized under the banner of Bazm E Maikash by Maikash Sahebs' great-grandson Syed Faizi Ali Shah Niazi in Agra, where people with significant contributions to the urdu world are awarded.

Gallery

References

External links and further reading 

 Maikash Akbarabadi Poetry on Sufinama
 Blog Dedicated to SYED MOHAMMAD ALI SHAH JAFRI NIAZI'S KALAAM
  Maikash Akbarabadi in his own voice at Mushaira held in 1934
 Bazm e Maikash Videos on YouTube
 Khanqah Niazia Agra (Astaana Maikash Akbarabadi]
 Masail e Tasawwuf
 Touheed aur Shirk
 Farzand E Ghouse Azam

Indian male essayists
1902 births
1991 deaths
20th-century Indian poets
20th-century Indian essayists
20th-century Indian male writers
Indian people of Pashtun descent
People from Agra
Poets from Uttar Pradesh
Urdu-language poets from India